Pál Zolnay (26 March 1928 – 17 October 1995) was a Hungarian film director, screenwriter and actor. He directed eleven films between 1962 and 1995. His 1973 film Photography was entered into the 8th Moscow International Film Festival where it won the Silver Prize.

Selected filmography
 Photography (1973 - director)
 Diary for My Children (1984 - actor)
 Diary for My Lovers (1987 - actor)

References

External links

1928 births
1995 deaths
Hungarian film directors
Hungarian male film actors
Male screenwriters
Hungarian male writers
Writers from Budapest
20th-century Hungarian male actors
Male actors from Budapest
20th-century Hungarian screenwriters